D. Manfield Stearns (August 18, 1839—May 5, 1889) was a member of the Wisconsin State Assembly.

Biography
Daniel Mansfield Stearns was born on August 18, 1839 in Bakersfield, Vermont. He later resided in Sugar Creek, Wisconsin.  Stearns was a farmer, and served in local office including justice of the peace and town clerk.

Assembly career
Stearns was a member of the Assembly during the 1876 session. He was a Republican.

Death and burial
Stearns died in Sugar Creek on May 5, 1889.  He was buried at Mount Pleasant Cemetery in Tibbets, Wisconsin.

References

People from Bakersfield, Vermont
People from Sugar Creek, Wisconsin
Republican Party members of the Wisconsin State Assembly
1839 births
1889 deaths
19th-century American politicians